Lindsay Davenport and Martina Hingis defeated the defending champions Martina Navratilova and Jana Novotná in the final, 6–4, 6–4 to win the ladies' invitation doubles tennis title at the 2011 Wimbledon Championships.

Draw

Final

Group A
Standings are determined by: 1. number of wins; 2. number of matches; 3. in two-players-ties, head-to-head records; 4. in three-players-ties, percentage of sets won, or of games won; 5. steering-committee decision.

Group B
Standings are determined by: 1. number of wins; 2. number of matches; 3. in two-players-ties, head-to-head records; 4. in three-players-ties, percentage of sets won, or of games won; 5. steering-committee decision.

External links
Draw

Women's Invitation Doubles